Anti-Tiger is the second release by The Mint Chicks on Flying Nun Records and is their follow-up to the well-received Octagon, Octagon, Octagon. Anti-Tiger was issued in three formats: a 2-track 7"-single, a 6-track 10"-EP and a 6-track CD-EP. One of the EP-tracks, "Opium Of The People", was re-recorded for the Mint Chicks' first full-length, Fuck the Golden Youth, in 2005.  It developed the Mint Chicks' sound while keeping the intensity of their previous work.

Track listing

7"-single
A:"Anti-Tiger" - 3:03 
B:"Octagon, Octagon, Octagon (Live)"

10"/CD-EP
"Prelude" - 1:25
"Blue Team Go!" - 1:27
"Anti-Tiger" - 3:03
"Opium Of The People" - 3:33
"Fake Up" - 1:30
"The Perfect Machine" - 3:13

Tracks 1, 2 and 3 by Kody Neilson.
Tracks 4, 5 and 6 by Ruban and Kody Neilson.

Personnel

Paul Roper - Drums
Michael Logie - Bass Guitar
Kody Nielson - Vocals
Ruban Nielson - Guitar
Simon Lynch, Robert Stebbing - Mastering

The Mint Chicks albums
2004 EPs
Flying Nun Records EPs
Flying Nun Records singles